Jacob Laan (31 March 1869 – 5 April 1939) was a Dutch sports shooter. He competed in the trap event at the 1908 Summer Olympics.

References

1869 births
1939 deaths
Dutch male sport shooters
Olympic shooters of the Netherlands
Shooters at the 1908 Summer Olympics
Sportspeople from Zaanstad